Ocellularia inthanonensis is a species of corticolous (bark-dwelling) lichen in the family Graphidaceae. Found in northern Thailand, it was formally described as a new species in 2002 by lichenologists Natsurang Homchantara and Brian J. Coppins. The specific epithet refers to the type locality. The lichen has a whitish mineral-grey thallus that is wrinkled and irregularly cracked.

References

inthanonensis
Lichen species
Lichens described in 2002
Lichens of Thailand
Taxa named by Brian John Coppins
Taxa named by Natsurang Homchantara